Kiribati competed in the Summer Olympic Games for the second time at the 2008 Summer Olympics in Beijing, China, following their debut appearance in the 2004 Summer Olympics in Athens, Greece. The country had intended to send a total of three athletes to the Games, competing in two sports: athletics and weightlifting. Female sprinter Kaitinano Mwemweata had to withdraw due to illness after contracting tuberculosis.

Background
Kiribati had interest in Olympic participation in the 1980s, and the country later formed their National Olympic Committee (NOC) in 2002, which was recognized by the International Olympic Committee (IOC) in 2003. Kiribati's first Games was in 2004. As of these Olympics, Kiribati had never won an Olympic medal.

Weightlifter David Katoatau was Kiribati's flag bearer for the opening ceremonies. The flag bearer for the closing ceremony was Kiribati NOC president Birimaka Tekanene.

Athletics (track and field)

Kaitinano Mwemweata fell ill and did not participate in the Olympics, and was treated for tuberculosis instead. Her withdrawal left Kiribati with one representative in athletics. Rabangaki Nawai was entered in the 100 meter and 200 meter sprint events. Nawai ran a personal season's best time of 11.29 seconds in the first round of the 100 meter sprint. He had the fastest reaction time in the heat, but placed last, and failed to progress to the next round. He did not run in the 200 meter competition for undisclosed reasons.

Key

Weightlifting

David Katoatau represented Kiribati in the men's 85 kg class of the weightlifting competition, qualifying by wildcard. He finished in 15th place, ahead of Terrence Dixie of Seychelles and five lifters who did not finish the event.

References

Nations at the 2008 Summer Olympics
2008
Summer Olympics